"Lala (Unlocked)" (stylized as "LALA (Unlocked)") is a song by American singer Alicia Keys, featuring American singer and rapper Swae Lee. The song was written by Keys, Darryl Ellis, Khalif Brown, Michael L Williams II, Paul Richmond and Ruben Locke and produced by Keys and Mike Will Made It. It was released through RCA Records as the lead single from Keys' eighth studio album, Keys (2021) on September 9, 2021.

Background and release
Keys announced the song on social media on September 1, posting a snippet of the song and the single's cover art. A 30-second snippet of the song was posted on Keys's YouTube channel on September 4, 2021. In in interview on Apple Music 1 with Zane Lowe, Keys explained the creative process of the collaboration:

Composition
"Lala" is an R&B song that samples "In the Mood" by Tyrone Davis. Swae Lee sings on the track "Light the incense/ Not to mention/ Skin like whiskey/ She's cold like on the rocks". Keys sings "Feelings get lost in the lala".

Critical reception
Rolling Stone called the song "sultry" and wrote that Keys and Lee "trade flirtatious lines" on the song. Rap-Up wrote that Keys and Lee "show off their chemistry as they trade love-drunk verses" on the "breezy" track. In his review of the album, Liam Inscoe-Jones from The Line of Best Fit called the song “slick”, but opined that the song should have been on the Originals side of the album.

Live performances
Keys and Swae Lee performed the song at the 2021 MTV Video Music Awards on September 12, 2021. Their performance was broadcast from Liberty State Park. Rolling Stone wrote that Keys sang "sultry rendition" of the song while Vibe commented that Keys' and Lee's "creative chemistry translated from the studio to the big stage". USA Today ranked the performance as the fifth best performance of the show while Paste named it one of the best performances, commenting that "Swae Lee['s] heavily autotuned vocals were quite a contrast to Keys’ effortlessly smooth singing". The performance "was pretty forgettable" according to New York Post.

Charts

References

2021 singles
2021 songs
Alicia Keys songs
RCA Records singles